Amanita caesareoides is a species of Amanita from China, Korea, and Japan.

References

External links
 
 

caesareoides